Bishnupur district is a proposed district in Medinipur division, West Bengal. The district will be formed by dividing the Bankura district.

History 
On 1 August 2022, Chief Minister of West Bengal Mamata Banerjee declared the creation of Bishnupur district carving out from Bankura district.

Education

College
 Ramananda College
 Mallabhum Institute of Technology
 Sonamukhi College
 Chatra Ramai Pandit Mahavidyalaya
 Swami Dhananjoy Das Kathiababa Mahavidyalaya

Health facilities 
The district has 1 District hospital,1 Superspeciality Hospital and 5 rural hospitals.

References

Proposed districts of West Bengal